Wilson Branch is a stream in Vernon County in the U.S. state of Missouri. It is a tributary of West Fork Clear Creek.

Wilson Branch has the name of Colonel Wilson, a pioneer citizen.

See also
List of rivers of Missouri

References

Rivers of Vernon County, Missouri
Rivers of Missouri